Joshua Espineli Garcia (born October 7, 1997), known professionally as Joshua Garcia, is a Filipino actor, dancer, and commercial model. He began his professional acting career in 2015 after being part of the reality show Pinoy Big Brother: All In as a contestant. He rose to prominence for his critically acclaimed performances in the 2016 Metro Manila Film Festival top-grosser Vince and Kath and James and in the primetime series The Good Son. Garcia has starred in various TV series such as Nasaan Ka Nang Kailangan Kita (2015), The Greatest Love (2016), Ngayon at Kailanman (2018), The Killer Bride (2019), Viral Scandal (2021), and Darna (2022). He has also starred in the films  Love You to the Stars and Back (2017),  Unexpectedly Yours (2017), I Love You, Hater (2018), and Block Z (2020).

Early life 
Garcia was born on October 7, 1997 in Bauan, Batangas, Philippines. He is the son of Filipino parents Geo Garcia and Marife Espineli. Coming from a broken family, he was raised by his father and his priest uncle alongside his elder sister, Lorenza Mae. He also has three younger paternal half-siblings and two maternal half-siblings.

He is a dancer and used to be a member of the Batangas cultural dance group, the Sining Kumintang before joining the reality TV show Pinoy Big Brother: All In as one of the 19 housemates who entered the Big Brother house.

Career

2015–2016: Career beginnings and breakthrough
Fresh from his stint in Pinoy Big Brother, Garcia started his acting career via the afternoon series Nasaan Ka Nang Kailangan Kita alongside fellow housemates Jane Oineza and Loisa Andalio. In the same year, he made his film debut in a supporting role in the Maja Salvador starrer You're Still The One. Garcia's acting chops first garnered attention when he played a supporting character for the Olivia Lamasan movie Barcelona: A Love Untold starring Kathryn Bernardo and Daniel Padilla, which earned him a Best Supporting Actor nomination in the FAMAS Awards.

In 2016, he was included in the powerhouse ensemble cast of the family drama The Greatest Love.

Garcia's breakthrough came in when he got his first movie leading role in the 2016 Metro Manila Film Festival entry Vince and Kath and James where he won New Movie Actor of the Year in the 33rd PMPC Star Awards for Movies. His acting performance received wide critical acclaim and even scored Best Actor nominations in the said festival's awards, the 35th Luna Awards and the 2017 FAMAS Awards along with his Best Supporting Actor nomination for Barcelona: A Love Untold.

2017–present: Rising popularity and success
Following the blockbuster success of Vince and Kath and James and his tandem with actress Julia Barretto, they both starred in a string of television and movie projects together. Their tandem made their television debut in an episode of the country's longest-running drama anthology Maalaala Mo Kaya where they played as teen sweethearts who learn the value of unconditional love at a young age. Their performances was widely praised by the viewers and also dominated the trending topics on Twitter.

Later that year, Garcia starred in his follow-up movie with Barretto in the romantic comedy-drama Love You to the Stars and Back which was a box-office success. His portrayal of Caloy, a teen suffering from leukemia likewise earned himself another round of Best Actor nominations in FAMAS and Luna Awards. His partnership with Barretto in the box office continued in the same year with Unexpectedly Yours where they starred alongside veteran actors Sharon Cuneta and Robin Padilla.

In 2017, he headlined an ensemble cast in the crime drama primetime series The Good Son alongside Jerome Ponce, McCoy de Leon and Nash Aguas. He won various acting awards for his highly acclaimed portrayal in the series as Joseph Buenavidez including a "Best Drama Actor" recognition in the 32nd PMPC Star Awards for Television.

In 2018, Garcia and Barretto starred in the romantic comedy movie I Love You, Hater with Kris Aquino. After four big-screen projects together, they finally made their teleserye debut via the primetime TV series Ngayon at Kailanman which premiered on August that same year.

In 2019, he was part of the lead cast of the primetime TV series The Killer Bride which paired him with actress Janella Salvador. This also reunited him with Maja Salvador from their previous collaboration in You're Still The One where he made his film acting debut.

In 2020, he reunited with Barretto accompanied by an all-star ensemble cast in the zombie film Block Z which was directed by award-winning director Mikhail Red. After his long-standing partnership with Barretto ended, he starred in solo projects including various episodes of Maalaala Mo Kaya.

In 2021, he made a return to primetime television and joined the lead cast of the TV series  Viral Scandal opposite Charlie Dizon. Later the following year, he starred as the male lead in ABS-CBN's TV adaptation of  Mars Ravelo's Darna starring Jane de Leon which also reunited him with Janella Salvador. 

In 2023, he topbills the cast of the romantic drama TV series  Unbreak My Heart with Jodi Sta. Maria, Richard Yap and Gabbi Garcia which is a historic partnership and co-production of his home network ABS-CBN and long-time rival GMA Network. He will also star in the movie adaptation of Bob Ong's best-selling book Ang Mga Kaibigan Ni Mama Susan.

Personal life
Garcia dated actress Julia Barretto after starring in numerous projects together as a love team. Their two-year relationship ended in April 2019.

In 2020, he started taking an entrepreneurship course at Southville International School affiliated with Foreign Universities (SISFU) in Las Piñas.

Filmography

Film

Television

Discography

Awards and nominations

References

External links

Living people
1997 births
People from Batangas
Male actors from Batangas
Filipino male television actors
Filipino male film actors
Filipino male models
Filipino male dancers
Pinoy Big Brother contestants
ABS-CBN personalities
Star Magic